Kiva Dunes is a public golf course located in Baldwin County, just west of Gulf Shores, Alabama. The course was designed by professional golfer Jerry Pate, and was immediately ranked #2 in Golf Digest's Best New Public Course (US) when it opened in 1995. More recently, the publication ranked the course #58 on America’s 100 Greatest Public Courses. GolfLink currently lists Kiva Dunes as one of the best golf course in the state  and it is ranked #44 in Golf Week's Top 100 Resort Courses and #76 in their Top 100 Residential Courses.

References

External links
Kiva Dunes Home Page
Jerry Pate portfolio

Buildings and structures in Baldwin County, Alabama
Landmarks in Alabama
Golf clubs and courses in Alabama
Tourist attractions in Baldwin County, Alabama